The Charleston Charlies were a Triple-A minor league baseball team located in Charleston, West Virginia. Two separate Charlies franchises played in the International League from 1971 to 1983. The team was the relocated Columbus Jets. In 1977 the franchise was returned to Columbus and Charlies owner Robert Lavine purchased the Memphis Blues, moving the team to Charleston, assuming the Charlies name. The Charlies were affiliated with the Pittsburgh Pirates (1971–76), Houston Astros (1977–79), Texas Rangers (1980), and Cleveland Indians (1981–83). The 1973 Charlies won the league's regular-season title. The original Charlies moved back to Columbus as the Columbus Clippers in 1977.

The new Charlies, which were the re-located Memphis Blues won the 1977 Governors' Cup, awarded to the IL's playoff championship, while the 1978 teams won the league's regular-season title. The franchise relocated in 1984 to Old Orchard Beach, Maine, playing as the Maine Guides. Today, the franchise is known as the Scranton/Wilkes-Barre RailRiders.

History

Many Charleston residents fondly remember the logo of the Charlies, which was a baseball with a derby hat on and smiling while a cigar hung from the corner of his mouth. In the morning paper of The Charleston Gazette on the front page the day after a Charlies game, the logo would be displayed with a smile if the Charlies won or a frown if the Charlies lost.

The Charlies were owned by Bob Levine, who bought the Columbus Jets, moving them from Columbus, Ohio to Charleston in 1971 and renamed them Charleston Charlies in honor of his father, Charlie Levine, who was an avid baseball fan who watched the Charlies seated in a wheelchair, wearing a derby hat, and smoking a cigar. The elder Levine referred to himself as "Poor Charlie" during his earlier years as a scrap-metal dealer in Beckley, West Virginia. Charlie Levine died in 1981 at age 89 and Bob Levine died at age 87 in 2011.

In 1977 the team relocated back to Columbus to become the Columbus Clippers and the Memphis Blues relocated to Charleston and assumed the Charlies name.

Levine announced in August 1981 that we would sell the franchise and sought local owners. The club was purchased by a group led by Carl Steinfeldt. In December 1982, Jordan Kobritz purchased the team from Steinfelt. Korbitz kept the team in Charleston in 1983. The Charlies then relocated to Old Orchard Beach, Maine, for the 1984 season, becoming the Maine Guides.

Former players

Many former major leaguers spent time with the Charlies including Pirates All-Stars Dave Parker, Richie Zisk, John Candelaria and Kent Tekulve. Others star players included reliever Gene Garber, the Astros' Terry Puhl, Yankee fan favorite Rick Cerone, Phillies star Von Hayes, slugger Tony Armas, former St. Louis Cardinals manager Tony La Russa, and former New York Mets manager Willie Randolph.

Six former Charleston Charlies players have been major league managers:  La Russa and Randolph, as well as Bobby Valentine, Luis Pujols, Art Howe, and Ken Macha.  Valentine (1996–2002), Howe (2003–2004) and Randolph (2005–2008) all managed the New York Mets and La Russa (1988–1995), Howe (1996–2002) and Macha (2003–2006) managed the Oakland Athletics.

Former Major League baseball player and Atlanta Braves coach, Jim Beauchamp managed the Charleston Charlies from 1977 to 1979.

Earlier Charleston Minor League Clubs

Charleston's first Triple-A club, the Charleston Senators, moved to town on June 23, 1952, when the original Toledo Mud Hens franchise shifted there. The Senators played in the American Association through the 1960 season. They were farm clubs of the Chicago White Sox, Detroit Tigers and Washington Senators at various times during this period.

On May 19, 1961, after only five weeks of play, the St. Louis Cardinals abandoned their plans to place their Triple-A International League affiliate in San Juan, Puerto Rico, and moved the team, nicknamed the Marlins, to Charleston to finish out the season. This club – Charleston's second Triple-A franchise – stayed only those few months and relocated to Atlanta, for the 1962 season to become the Atlanta Crackers.

Charleston had a team, the West Virginia Power, in the Low A South Atlantic League until the 2020 reorganization of the Minor Leagues resulted in Charleston being left without an MLB affiliate. Historically, it has also been represented in the Eastern League and the mid-20th century Middle Atlantic League, among others.

Notes

References
Lloyd Johnson and Miles Wolff, editors. The Encyclopedia of Minor League Baseball, 1997 edition. Durham, North Carolina: Baseball America.

Baseball teams established in 1971
Baseball teams disestablished in 1983
Charleston, West Virginia
Defunct International League teams
Professional baseball teams in West Virginia
Pittsburgh Pirates minor league affiliates
Houston Astros minor league affiliates
Texas Rangers minor league affiliates
Cleveland Guardians minor league affiliates
Defunct baseball teams in West Virginia